Avrig is a town in Sibiu County, Romania.

Avrig may also refer to:

 Avrig (river), tributary of the river Olt in Sibiu County, Romania
 Avrig Lake, mountain lake in Sibiu County, Romania